You’re Never Too Young is a 1955 American semi-musical comedy film directed by Norman Taurog and starring the team of Martin and Lewis and co-starring Diana Lynn, Nina Foch, and Raymond Burr. It was released on August 25, 1955 by Paramount Pictures.

Plot
A valuable diamond is stolen at a Los Angeles hotel and a man guarding it is killed. The thief, Noonan, hides it from police, first in the jacket of a customer, Bob Miles, and then in the pocket of a barber's apprentice, Wilbur Hoolick.

Wilbur, boarding a train to go home to Blitzen, Washington, pretends to be an eleven-year-old in order to purchase a ticket for half price. Noonan sits beside him, still trying to retrieve the stolen jewel. Wilbur gets the impression that the thief is a jealous husband. He hides in the compartment of Nancy Collins, a teacher at a private girls' school. Feeling sorry for "young" Wilbur traveling alone, she allows him to stay there for the duration of the train ride.

During a stop-over, Gretchen Brendan, the jealous daughter of the school's headmistress, boards the train and finds out that Nancy is sharing her compartment with "a man." Gretchen hurries to the school to let Nancy's fiancee, Bob, in on this news, then tries to get Nancy dismissed. In order to protect Nancy's job and reputation, Wilbur must continue the charade of pretending to be a child. He accompanies "Aunt Nancy" to the all-girl school. The jewel thief follows them.

Along the way, Wilbur falls in love with Nancy, although she still thinks of him as a little boy. Noonan pretends to be Wilbur's father and regains possession of the diamond. But the police have arrived and a speedboat chase ensues. In the end, the thief is captured and Wilbur's identity is revealed. Nancy still loves Bob, but he is off to join the Army and discovers that Wilbur is his barber.

Cast

 Dean Martin as Bob Miles
 Jerry Lewis as Wilbur Hoolick
 Diana Lynn as Nancy Collins
 Nina Foch as Gretchen Brendan
 Raymond Burr as Noonan
 Tommy Ivo as Marty
 Nancy Kulp as Marty's mother
 Veda Ann Borg as Noonan's wife
 Mitzi McCall as Skeets
 Emory Parnell as Train Conductor
 Margery Maude as Mrs. Ella Brennan
 Milton Frome as Lt. O'Malley
 Bobby Barber as Train Station Newsstand Clerk
 James Burke as Pullman Conductor
 Hans Conried as Francois
 Robert Carson as Tailor
 Franklyn Farnum as Man in Ticket Line
 Bess Flowers as Extra in Lobby
 Tommy Ivo as Marty
 Tor Johnson as Train Passenger
 Hank Mann as Train Passenger
 Peggy Moffitt as Agnes
 Paul Newlan as Husky Man at Train Station
 Emory Parnell as Train Conductor
 Isabel Randolph as Teacher
 Dick Simmons as Professor

Production
You're Never Too Young was filmed from October 18 to December 27, 1954. This film is a gender-swapped remake of another Paramount film, The Major and the Minor (1942), directed by Billy Wilder — his first American film as director — and co-written by Wilder and Charles Brackett. Both films were adapted from the play Connie Goes Home by Edward Childs Carpenter.

Diana Lynn previously appeared with Martin and Lewis in their first film, My Friend Irma (1949), as well as its sequel, My Friend Irma Goes West (1950).  She is also featured in The Major and the Minor, which You're Never Too Young is based on.

Re-release
In 1964, Paramount re-released You're Never Too Young with another Martin and Lewis film, The Caddy (1953).

Home media
The film was included on a five-film DVD set, the Dean Martin and Jerry Lewis Collection: Volume Two, released on June 5, 2007.

See also
List of American films of 1955

References

External links 

1955 films
1955 comedy films
American comedy films
Remakes of American films
American films based on plays
1950s English-language films
Films directed by Norman Taurog
Films scored by Walter Scharf
Films set in schools
Paramount Pictures films
Films with screenplays by Sidney Sheldon
1950s American films